Membrane frizzled-related protein is a protein that in humans is encoded by the MFRP gene.

References

Further reading